Waiau could refer to several places in New Zealand:

Settlements
 Waiau Pa, south of Auckland
 Waiau, Waikato, on the Coromandel Peninsula
 Waiau, Bay of Plenty, between Waihi and Waihi Beach
 Waiau, Taranaki
 Waiau, Canterbury
 Franz Josef / Waiau, on the West Coast near Franz Josef Glacier

Geographic features
 Waiau Bay
 Waiau River, Hawke's Bay
 Waiau River, Canterbury
 Waiau River, Southland
 Waiho River on the West Coast, formerly known as the Waiau River

Other New Zealand locations
 Waiau Branch, a Canterbury branch line railway in service from 1882 to 1978: see also Weka Pass Railway

Elsewhere
Lake Waiau on Mauna Kea in Hawaii